The north-western sandslider (Lerista bipes)  is a species of skink found in Western Australia, Northern Territory, Queensland and South Australia.

References

Lerista
Reptiles described in 1882
Taxa named by Johann Gustav Fischer